Gazi Üniversitesispor is a women's football club from Ankara, Turkey. It is the team of the Gazi University and played in Turkey's top level league, the Turkish Women's Football Premier League.

History
The club was founded in the 1999–2000 season at Gazi University in Ankara with female students, who attended football courses in physical education and sports programs. The team played already in that season in the Turkish Women's Football League.

Gazi Üniversitesispor became Turkish Women's First Football League champion in the seasons 2006–07, 2007–08 and 2009–10.

Although they qualified for the UEFA Women's Cup after their championship titles, they did not attend those. They did, however, compete in the 2010–11 UEFA Women's Champions League, where they played three games in the qualifying round, losing 2 and drawing against Moldovan Roma Calfa.

Stadium
Gazi Üniversitesispor play their home matches at Gazi University Stadium situated within the university's campus in Ankara.

Statistics

International results

Achievements
Turkish Women's Football Premier League
Winners (3): 2007, 2008, 2010
Runners-up (1): 2003
Third Place (2): 2002, 2009

See also
 Turkish women in sports

References

External links
Club's website

Women's football clubs in Turkey
Gazi University
Football clubs in Ankara
Association football clubs established in 1999
1999 establishments in Turkey
Student sport in Turkey